

Major events
1726—Smolensk Governorate was created from parts of Moscow and Riga Governorates.

Subdivisions (as of 1726)
Archangelgorod Governorate (Архангелогородская губерния)
subdivided into provinces
Astrakhan Governorate (Астраханская губерния)
not subdivided
Kazan Governorate (Казанская губерния)
subdivided into provinces
Kiev Governorate (Киевская губерния)
subdivided into provinces
Moscow Governorate (Московская губерния)
subdivided into provinces
Nizhny Novgorod Governorate (Нижегородская губерния)
subdivided into provinces
Revel Governorate (Ревельская губерния)
not subdivided
Riga Governorate (Рижская губерния)
subdivided into provinces
St. Petersburg Governorate (Санкт-Петербургская губерния)
subdivided into provinces
Siberian Governorate (Сибирская губерния)
subdivided into provinces
Smolensk Governorate (Смоленская губерния)
subdivided into provinces
Voronezh Governorate (Воронежская губерния)
subdivided into provinces

1726
1720s in Russia